Sarah Zucker, born 1985, is an American visual artist and writer based in Hollywood, Los Angeles. She specializes in mixing contemporary digital techniques with older analog approaches as well as the use of VHS. Zucker is considered a pioneer of crypto art, releasing digital editions of her video art as non-fungible tokens since 2019.

Life and career 
In the early 2010s, Zucker ran a web design firm, but soon shifted her art practice to focus on screen-based art.

In 2014, Zucker established the design and animation studio YoMeryl together with the artist Bronwyn Lundberg. Together, they were the first artists to present .gif images as art at the Brooklyn Museum.

In June 2021, her work was sold at Sotheby’s as part of “Natively Digital,” the auction house’s first curated NFT Sale. That same month, her work was sold at Bonhams as part of “CryptOGs: The Pioneers of NFT Art,” achieving a record price for her work at auction.

Selected Art Shows 

 "Natively Digital" at Sotheby's, 2021
 "Venus of Metaverse: A Celebration of Women Creators in Crypto Art" at Tara Digital Collective, 2021
 "CryptOGs": The Pioneers of NFT Art" at Bonhams, 2021
 "Right Click + Save" at Le Freeport in Singapore, 2021
 "DART2121" at Museo della Permanente in Milan, 2021
 "The Gateway" presented by NFTNow x Christie’s at Art Basel Miami, 2021
 "Block Party" at Christie’s Dubai, 2022

Trivia 

Zucker is a Jeopardy! champion.

References

External links
Official website

1985 births
Living people
21st-century American women artists
American video artists
New media artists
Digital artists
Women digital artists
American digital artists